Luka Petrušić (born 15 September 1982) is a Croatian actor. He appeared in more than thirty films since 1997.

Selected filmography

References

External links 

1982 births
Living people
Croatian male film actors